TER Nord-Pas-de-Calais was the regional rail network serving Nord-Pas-de-Calais région, France. In 2017 it was merged into the new TER Hauts-de-France.

Network 

Lille – Calais – Boulogne-sur-Mer (TER grande vitesse)
Lille – Dunkerque (TER grande vitesse)
Lille – Arras (TER grande vitesse)

Rolling stock

Multiple units
 SNCF Class Z 23500
 SNCF Class Z 24500
 SNCF Class Z 92050
 SNCF Class X 4500
 SNCF Class X 73500
 SNCF Class X 76500 also called XGC X 76500
 SNCF Class Z 26500

Locomotives
 SNCF Class BB 16500
 SNCF Class BB 66400
 SNCF Class BB 67400

Schemes

TER grande vitesse
With the objective of connecting all the towns on the Northwest coast to Lille in less than an hour, the Nord-Pas de Calais région has put in place TERGV. Certain trains, with the agreement of the SNCF, use the LGV Nord from Lille-Europe to reach their destination instead of conventional lines. This enables them to connect Lille to Calais, Boulogne-sur-Mer, Dunkirk and Arras in less than an hour.

TER-MER
Three or four weekends per year the Nord-Pas-de-Calais regional council offers a promotion called opération TER-MER. The promotion offers return tickets to a chosen beach for €1; passengers travel to a local station from where shuttle buses guarantee an on-connection to the beach. This promotion was used by 50,000 people in 2005.

Electrification Completed
The railway is electrified from Calais-Ville via Gravelines to Dunkerque.

Future projects
The region envisages to:
 double and electrify the line between Calais and Dunkirk
 build two new lines between Arras and Cambrai and between Douai and Orchies
 reopen the line between Béthune and Bruay-la-Buissière
 increase frequency of service between Lille and Lens
 create a new high speed regional service between Fourmies, Maubeuge and Lille, to reduce travel time from an hour and thirty minutes to forty-five minutes.

External links
 TER Nord-Pas-de-Calais website

 
TER